Slag Wars: The Next Destroyer is a British reality television competition series that premiered online on 27 November 2020. The show features Rebecca More and Sophie Anderson on their hunt to discover the next LGBTQ+ icon.

Cast
 Sophie Anderson
 Rebecca More	
 Matthew Camp
 Chase Icon (Narrator)

Contestants

Contestant progress 

  The contestant won Slag Wars.
 The contestant was a runner-up.
 The contestant left the competition voluntarily.
 The contestant won the challenge.
 The contestant was declared safe.
 The contestant was in the bottom.
 The contestant was eliminated.

Episodes

Reception
Slag Wars has garnered widespread positive reception featuring in notable media outlets such as  VICE, i-D, Out Magazine, Pink magazine, and more.

See also
 Gay icon
 Gay pride
 LGBT culture

References

External links
 Slag Wars website
 Slag Wars on IMDb

2020s LGBT-related reality television series
2020 British television series debuts
2020 British television series endings
British LGBT-related web series
Reality web series
Works about pornography
British non-fiction web series
Reality competition television series